Colpothylax is a genus of mites in the family Parasitidae.

Species
 Colpothylax exilis (Berlese, 1883)

References

Parasitidae